Emilio Lussu (4 December 1890 – 5 March 1975) was an Italian soldier, politician, anti-fascist and writer.

Biography

The soldier

Lussu was born in Armungia, province of Cagliari (Sardinia) and graduated with a degree in law in 1914. Lussu married Joyce Salvadori, a notable poet, and member of the noble Paleotti family of the Marche, who were counts of Fermo. 
Prior to the entry of Italy into World War I, Lussu joined the army and was involved in several skirmishes. As a complementary officer of the Sassari Infantry Brigade in 1916 he was stationed on the Asiago Plateau. The brigade had arrived on the plateau in May 1916 to help in the Italian effort to stop the Austrian Spring offensive. In the month of June 1916 the brigade conquered Monte Fior, Monte Castelgomberto, Monte Spil, Monte Miela and Monte Zebio. After the war Lussu wrote the book A Year on the High Plateau (Un anno sull'altipiano) about his experiences of trench warfare on the Plateau. The 1970 movie Many Wars Ago ("Uomini contro") by Francesco Rosi is taken from this book.

Politics and exile

After the war Lussu, together with Camillo Bellieni, founded the Partidu Sardu-Partito Sardo d'Azione (Sardinian Action Party), that blended social-democratic ideas and Sardinian nationalism. The party took a formal position in 1921, opposing the increasing power of the Fascist movement. Lussu was elected to the Italian parliament in 1921 and, in 1924 was among the Aventine secessionists who withdrew from the Italian Parliament after the murder of Giacomo Matteotti.

Lussu's anti-Fascist position was, at the time, one of the most radical in Italy. Lussu was physically attacked and injured by unknown aggressors several times. In 1926, during one of these attacks (notably, the same day that Benito Mussolini suffered an attack in Bologna), Lussu shot one of the squadristi, in self-defense. He was arrested and tried; and was acquitted. However, he was re-tried by an administrative Fascist commission and sentenced to 5 years of confinement on the island of Lipari, near Sicily.

In 1929 Lussu escaped from his confinement and reached Paris. There, together with Gaetano Salvemini and Carlo Rosselli he formed Giustizia e Libertà (Justice and Freedom), an anti-Fascist movement that proposed revolutionary methods to upset the Italian Fascist Regime. While in exile came to be known as "Mister Mills".

In 1938 Lussu's novel Un anno sull'altipiano ("A Year on the Plateau"), was published in Paris. This thinly fictional account tells of the lives of soldiers during World War I and the trench warfare they encountered. Un anno sull'altipiano underlines, with chill rationalism, how the irrationalities of warfare affected the common man. Gifted with a keen sense of observation and sharp logic, Lussu demonstrates how distant the real life of soldiers is from everyday activities. In a notable passage, he describes the silent terror in the moments preceding an attack, as he is forced to abandon the "safe" protective trench for an external unknown, risky, undefined world: "All the machine-guns are waiting for us".

Return to Italy

Lussu took part in the civil war in Spain. Between 1941 and 1942 he was the protagonist of the most important "episode" of the collaboration between British Special Operations Executive and Italian antifascism in exile. He tried to get the clearance for an antifascist uprising in Sardinia, which the SOE supported at some stage but did not receive approval from the Foreign Office. He returned to Italy after the armistice of 1943 when joined the Resistenza and became the secretary of Partito d'Azione for southern Italy. He became the leader of the left wing of Partito d'Azione and later joined forces with the Italian Socialist Party (PSI). After World War II he served as a Minister of Aid in the government of Ferruccio Parri and later as a minor minister in Alcide De Gasperi's government.

In 1964 he separated from the PSI, creating the Italian Socialist Party of Proletarian Unity (PSIUP). Ideological differences with the political line of Partito Sardo d'Azione deepened and Lussu left Sardinia.

Emilio Lussu died in Rome in 1975.

Works

Many political meanings have been drawn from Lussu's works, but his works are perhaps more important at a personal level. Morally and philosophically, Lussu's books reflect his need to repent, having been previously an interventista (favourable to entering the war) and a revolutionary (in Giustizia e Libertà); his works soberly describe what war, in its cruellest moments, was like for him.

The alteration of Lussu's opinion of war is quite apparent in the range of his works: first an interventista, then the author of a manual for revolution, soon afterwards the author of a pacifist book, then again a revolutionary and a volunteer in the Spanish civil war. Anyway, A Year on the High Plateau combines well the repulse of the war with the bravery of the fighter. Lussu's consistency has been questioned and politics often invades evaluations of his works.

Bibliography
La catena (1929)
Marcia su Roma e dintorni (The March on Rome and Thereabouts, 1932)
Teoria dell'insurrezione ("Theory of Insurrection", 1936)
Per l'Italia dall'esilio (Road to exile: the story of a Sardinian patriot, 1938) (August 3, 1936 review in Time magazine)
Un anno sull'altipiano ("A Year on the High Plateau", Sassari Infantry Brigade, 1938, ; "A Soldier on the Southern Front")
Diplomazia clandestina (1955)
La clericalizzazione dello Stato e l'arcivescovo di Cagliari (1958)
Il cinghiale del diavolo e altri scritti sulla Sardegna (1976)

In the Florestano Vancini's film The Assassination of Matteotti (1973), Lussu is played by Giovanni Brusatori.

Honours and awards

  Silver Medal for Valor  (Col del rosso, January 28th   1918)
  Silver Medal for Valor (Campo d'argine, June  16th 1918)
  Bronze Medal for Valor (Altipiano di Asiago, July 1916)
  Bronze Medal for Valor (November 1916)
  War Merit Cross 
  Commemorative Medal for the Italo-Austrian War 1915–1918
   Commemorative Medal of the Unity of Italy
  Order of Vittorio Veneto
   Medaglia commemorativa italiana della vittoria

References

Sources
 Rossi, Umberto. (3 September 2005). "The Alcoholics of War: Experiencing Chemical and Ideological Drunkenness in Emilio Lussu's Un anno sull'altipiano", Mosaic 38:77–94.

1890 births
1975 deaths
People from the Province of Cagliari
Action Party (Italy) politicians
Italian Socialist Party politicians
Italian Socialist Party of Proletarian Unity politicians
Government ministers of Italy
Deputies of Legislature XXVI of the Kingdom of Italy
Deputies of Legislature XXVII of the Kingdom of Italy
Members of the National Council (Italy)
Members of the Constituent Assembly of Italy
Senators of Legislature I of Italy
Senators of Legislature II of Italy
Senators of Legislature III of Italy
Senators of Legislature IV of Italy
Politicians of Sardinia
Sardinian nationalists
Italian anti-fascists
Members of Giustizia e Libertà
Italian military personnel of World War I
Sardinian literature
20th-century Italian novelists
20th-century Italian male writers
Exiled Italian politicians
Italian Aventinian secessionists